The Nebra sky disc is a bronze disc of around  diameter and a weight of , having a blue-green patina and inlaid with gold symbols. These symbols are interpreted generally as the Sun or full moon, a lunar crescent, and stars (including a cluster of seven stars interpreted as the Pleiades). Two golden arcs along the sides, interpreted to mark the angle between the solstices, were added later. A final addition was another arc at the bottom with internal parallel lines, which is usually interpreted as a solar boat with numerous oars, though some authors have also suggested that it may represent a rainbow, or the Aurora Borealis.

The disc was found buried on the Mittelberg hill near Nebra in Germany. Various scientific analyses of the disc, the items found with the disc, and the find spot have confirmed the Early Bronze Age dating.

The Nebra sky disc features the oldest concrete depiction of astronomical phenomena known from anywhere in the world. In June 2013, it was included in the UNESCO Memory of the World Register and termed "one of the most important archaeological finds of the twentieth century."

Discovery
The disc, together with two bronze swords, two sets of remains of axes, a chisel, and fragments of spiral armbands were discovered in 1999 by Henry Westphal and Mario Renner while they were treasure-hunting with a metal detector. The detectorists were operating without a license, and knew their activity constituted looting and was illegal. Archaeological artefacts are the property of the state in Saxony-Anhalt. They damaged the disc with their spade and destroyed parts of the site. The next day, Westphal and Renner sold the entire hoard for 31,000 DM to a dealer in Cologne. The hoard changed hands, probably several times, within Germany during the next two years, being sold for up to a million DM. By 2001 knowledge of its existence had become public. In February 2002 the state archaeologist, Harald Meller, acquired the disc in a police-led sting operation in Basel from a couple who had put it on the black market for 700,000 DM. The original finders were eventually traced. In a plea bargain, they led police and archaeologists to the discovery site. Archaeologists opened a dig at the site and uncovered evidence that supported the looters' claims. There were traces of bronze artefacts in the ground, and the soil at the site matched soil samples found clinging to the artefacts. The disc and its accompanying finds are held by the State Museum of Prehistory in Halle, Saxony-Anhalt, Germany. 

The two looters received sentences of four months and ten months, respectively, from a Naumburg court in September 2003. They appealed, but the Appeals Court raised their sentences to six and twelve months, respectively.

The discovery site is a prehistoric enclosure encircling the top of a  elevation in the Ziegelroda Forest, known as Mittelberg ("central hill"), some 60 km west of Leipzig. The surrounding area is known to have been settled in the Neolithic era, and Ziegelroda Forest contains approximately 1,000 barrows.

At the enclosure's location, the sun seems to set every summer solstice behind the Brocken, the highest peak of the Harz mountains, some 80 km to the north-west. The treasure-hunters claimed the artefacts were discovered within a pit inside the bank-and-ditch enclosure.

Dating

Axes and swords found buried with the disc can be dated typologically to c.1700-1500 BCE. Remains of birch bark found in the sword hilts have been Radiocarbon dated to between 1600 and 1560 BCE, confirming this estimate. This corresponds to the date of burial, at which time the disc had likely been in existence for several generations. Analyses of metal radioactivity and the corrosion layer on the disc further support the early Bronze Age dating.

Origin of the metals
According to an initial analysis of trace elements by x-ray fluorescence by E. Pernicka, then at the University of Freiberg, the copper originated at Bischofshofen in Austria, whilst the gold was thought to be from the Carpathian Mountains. A more recent analysis found that the gold used in the first development phase (see below) was from the River Carnon in Cornwall, United Kingdom. The tin present in the bronze was also of Cornish origin.

History
As preserved, the disc was developed in four stages:
 Initially the disc had thirty-two small round gold circles, a large circular plate, and a large crescent-shaped plate attached. The circular plate is interpreted as either the Sun or the full Moon, the crescent shape as the crescent Moon (or either the Sun or the Moon undergoing eclipse), and the dots as stars, with the cluster of seven dots likely representing the Pleiades.
 At some later date, two arcs (constructed from gold of a different origin, as shown by its chemical impurities) were added at opposite edges of the disc. To make space for these arcs, one small circle was moved from the left side toward the centre of the disc and two of the circles on the right were covered over, so that thirty remain visible. The two arcs span an angle of 82°, correctly indicating the angle between the positions of sunset at summer and winter solstice at the latitude of the Mittelberg (51°N). Given that the arcs relate to solar phenomena, it is likely the circular plate represents the Sun not the Moon.
 The final addition was another arc at the bottom, identified as a solar boat, again made of gold, but originating from a different source.
 By the time the disc was buried it also had thirty-nine holes punched out around its perimeter, each approximately 3 mm in diameter.

Significance

The find is regarded as reconfirming that the astronomical knowledge and abilities of the people of the European Bronze Age included close observation of the yearly course of the Sun, and the angle between its rising and setting points at the summer and winter solstices. While much older earthworks and megalithic astronomical complexes, such as the Goseck circle and Stonehenge, had already been used to mark the solstices, the disc presents this knowledge in the form of a portable object. The disc may have had both a practical astronomical purpose as well as a religious significance.

The depiction of the Pleiades on the disc in conjunction with a crescent moon has been interpreted as representing a calendar rule for harmonising the solar and lunar calendars. This rule is known from an ancient Babylonian text with the transcribed title of MUL.APIN. According to this rule, a leap month should be added when the Pleiades appear next to a crescent moon a few days old in the spring, as depicted on the disc. This conjunction occurs approximately every three years. Harald Meller suggests that knowledge of this rule may have come from Babylonia to Central Europe through long distance trade and contacts, despite it being attested earlier on the Nebra disc than in Babylonia.

The number of stars depicted on the disc (32) is also thought to be significant, possibly encoding the calendar rule numerically, in two different ways. Firstly, the conjunction of lunar crescent and Pleiades depicted on the disc occurs 32 days after the last 'new light' (the first visible crescent moon of the month), and not before. Secondly, 32 stars plus 1 sun (or full moon) equals 33, which is the number of lunar years in 32 solar years. That is, after 32 solar years, the time difference between lunar and solar years adds up to one whole lunar year, with an error of only two days. This is because a solar year has 365 days whereas a lunar year has approximately 354 days. So 365 x 32 = 11680 days, and 354 x 33 = 11682 days. 

The Nebra disc has also been compared to a passage from the Greek poet Hesiod in Works and Days, written around 700 BC:
"When the Pleiades, daughters of Atlas, are rising, begin your harvest, and your ploughing when they are going to set. Forty nights and days they are hidden and appear again as the year moves round, when first you sharpen your sickle. This is the law of the plains, and of those who live near the sea, and who inhabit rich country, the glens and hollows far from the tossing sea,—strip to sow and strip to plough and strip to reap, if you wish to get in all Demeter's fruits in due season, and that each kind may grow in its season."

A depiction of a sun and crescent moon similar to the Nebra disc appears on a gold signet ring from Mycenae in Greece, dating from the 15th century BC. Beneath the sun and moon is a seated female figure holding three opium poppies in her hand, identified as a goddess of nature and fertility, possibly the Minoan poppy goddess, or an early form of the goddess Demeter. Opium poppy has also been found in settlements of the Unetice culture. According to Kristiansen and Larsson (2005), imagery similar to that found on Mycenaean signet rings also appears in Nordic Bronze Age petroglyphs from the Kivik King's Grave in Sweden, dating from the 16th to 15th centuries BC.

Archaeoastronomist Emília Pásztor has argued against a practical astronomical function for the disc. According to Pásztor "the close agreement of the length of the peripheral arcs with the movement of the sun’s risings or settings might be a pure coincidence". This claim is undermined by the finding of a similar feature on the roughly contemporary gold lozenge from Bush Barrow at Stonehenge, where the acute angles of the overall design (81°) are equal to the angle between the solstices at the latitude of Stonehenge. According to Euan MacKie (2009) "The Nebra disc and the Bush Barrow lozenge both seem to be designed to reflect the annual solar cycle at about latitude 51° north." MacKie further suggests that both the Nebra disc and Bush Barrow lozenge may be linked to the solar calendar reconstructed by Alexander Thom from his analysis of standing stone alignments in Britain. Both the Nebra sky disc and Bush Barrow lozenge were made with gold from Cornwall, providing a direct link between them. According to the archaeologist Sabine Gerloff the gold plating technique used on the Nebra sky disc also originated in Britain, and was introduced from there to the continent.

Authenticity
There were some initial suspicions that the disc might be an archaeological forgery. Peter Schauer of the University of Regensburg, Germany, argued in 2005 that the Nebra disc was a fake and that he could prove that the patina of the disc could have been created with urine, hydrochloric acid, and a blow torch within a short amount of time. He had to admit in court that he had never held the disc in his own hands, unlike the eighteen scientists who had examined the disc. Scientific analyses of the patina (or corrosion layer) have confirmed its authenticity.

Richard Harrison, professor of European prehistory at the University of Bristol, stated in a BBC documentary that "When I first heard about the Nebra Disc I thought it was a joke, indeed I thought it was a forgery", due to the extraordinary nature of the find, although he had not seen the sky disc at the time. The same documentary presented scientific analyses confirming the authenticity of the disc.

A paper published in 2020 by Rupert Gebhard and Rudiger Krause questioned the Early Bronze Age dating of the Nebra disc and proposed a later Iron Age date instead. A response paper was published in the same year by Ernst Pernicka and colleagues, rejecting the arguments of Gebhard and Krause. Scientific analyses of the disc, the items found with the disc, and the find spot have all confirmed the Early Bronze Age dating.

Exhibition
The disc was the centre of an exhibition entitled Der geschmiedete Himmel (German "The forged sky"), showing 1,600 Bronze Age artefacts, including the Trundholm sun chariot, shown at Halle from 15 October 2004 to 22 May 2005, from 1 July to 22 October 2005 in Copenhagen, from 9 November 2005 to 5 February 2006 in Vienna, from 10 March to 16 July 2006 in Mannheim, and from 29 September 2006 to 25 February 2007 in Basel.

On 20 June 2007, a multimedia visitor centre was opened near the discovery site at Nebra.

The disc is part of the permanent exhibition in the Halle State Museum of Prehistory (Landesmuseum für Vorgeschichte) in Halle.

The disc was on display at the British Museum in London as part of The World Of Stonehenge Exhibition from 17 February to 17 July 2022.

The disc was on display at the Drents Museum in Assen from 6 August to 18 September 2022.

Replica on the ISS 
In November 2021, a Replica of the Nebra Sky Disc was launched to the International Space Station on the Crew-3 mission, taken by German astronaut Matthias Maurer. Maurer, who is part of the European mission Cosmic Kiss, designed the mission's patch with inspiration from the Nebra Sky Disk, as well as the Pioneer plaques and Voyager Golden Records that were sent into the unknown carrying messages from Earth.

Legal issues
The State of Saxony-Anhalt has registered the disc as a trademark, which has resulted in two lawsuits. In 2003, Saxony-Anhalt successfully sued the city of Querfurt for depicting the disc design on souvenirs. Saxony-Anhalt also successfully sued the publishing houses Piper and Heyne over an abstracted depiction of the disc on book covers. The Magdeburg court assessed the case's relevance according to German copyright law. The defenders argued that as a cult object, the disc had already been "published" approximately 3,500 years earlier in the Bronze Age, and that consequently, all protection of intellectual property associated with it has long expired. The plaintiff, on the other hand, argued that the editio princeps of the disc is recent, and according to German law protected for 25 years, until 2027. Another argument concerned the question of whether a notable work of art may be registered as a trademark in the first place. The Magdeburg court decided in favour of the State of Saxony-Anhalt.

The case was appealed and on the basis of decisions from the Oberlandesgericht Düsseldorf in 2005 and the Federal Court of Justice in 2009, the initial ruling was overturned and the German Patent and Trademark Office withdrew the trademark rights. Thereafter, the State of Saxony-Anhalt registered the design of the disc as a trademark with the European Union Intellectual Property Office.

See also

 
Bell Beaker culture

References

Further reading
 Ute Kaufholz: Sonne, Mond und Sterne. Das Geheimnis der Himmelsscheibe. Anderbeck, Anderbeck 2004, 
 Landesamt für Archäologie Sachsen-Anhalt (Hrsg.): Archäologie in Sachsen-Anhalt. Dt. Verl. d. Wissenschaften, Halle 1.2002, S.7–31. 
 Frank Hagen von Liegnitz: Die Sonnenfrau Weihnachtsgabe der WeserStrom Genossenschaft, Bremen 2002.
 Harald Meller (Hrsg.): Der geschmiedete Himmel. Die weite Welt im Herzen Europas vor 3600 Jahren. Ausstellungskatalog. Theiss-Verlag, Stuttgart 2004, 
 Katja Näther, Sven Näther: Akte Nebra – Keine Sonne auf der Himmelsscheibe? Naether, Wilhelmshorst 2004, 
 National Geographic Deutschland. Gruner + Jahr, Hamburg 2004,1, S.38–61, 
 Uwe Reichert: Der geschmiedete Himmel. in: Spektrum der Wissenschaft. Heidelberg 2004,11, S.52–59. 
 Ch. Sommerfeld : ...Sterne mal Sterne durch Sonne ist Mond - Bemerkungen über die Nebra-Scheibe, Praehistorische Zeitschrift, 87(1) 2012, S. 110–131. 
 Diedrich, Cajus: The "Sky Disk of Nebra" – revision to daily life "marriage and fertility" in the final Hallstatt (Early Iron Age, HaC-D) times. American Journal of Humanities and Social Science, 21, 2021, 1-26. http://journalsonline.org/american-journal-of-humanities-and-social-science/
Andreas Müller-Karpe, Die Himmelsscheibe von Nebra und ihre anatolischen Bezüge, Marburg 2021, ISBN                  978-3-8185-0563-9.

External links

 Official Landesmuseum website
 Study: Bronze disk is astronomical clock, United Press International, 2 March 2006.
 Calendar question over star disc, BBC News, 25 June 2007.
  Wolfhard Schlosser, Die Himmelsscheibe von Nebra - ein früher Blick des Menschen ins Universum (astronomie.de)
  Norbert Gasch, Eine vollständig astronomische Interpretation, 17 May 2005 (astronomie.de)

17th-century BC works
1999 archaeological discoveries
Archaeoastronomy
Archaeological discoveries in Germany
Archaeology of Saxony-Anhalt
Art discs and ovals
Bronze Age art
Bronze Age Germany
Bronze objects
Burgenlandkreis
Forgery controversies
Indo-European archaeological artifacts
Memory of the World Register
Moon in art
Sun in art
Unetice culture
Ancient art in metal